Gallic acid (also known as 3,4,5-trihydroxybenzoic acid) is a trihydroxybenzoic acid with the formula C6H2(OH)3CO2H. It is classified as a phenolic acid. It is found in gallnuts, sumac, witch hazel, tea leaves, oak bark, and other plants. It is a white solid, although samples are typically brown owing to partial oxidation.  Salts and esters of gallic acid are termed "gallates".

Its name is derived from oak galls, which were historically used to prepare tannic acid. Despite the name, gallic acid does not contain gallium.

Isolation and derivatives

Gallic acid is easily freed from gallotannins by acidic or alkaline hydrolysis. When heated with concentrated sulfuric acid,  gallic acid converts to rufigallol. Hydrolyzable tannins break down on hydrolysis to give gallic acid and glucose or ellagic acid and glucose, known as gallotannins and ellagitannins, respectively.

Biosynthesis 

Gallic acid is formed from 3-dehydroshikimate by the action of the enzyme shikimate dehydrogenase to produce 3,5-didehydroshikimate. This latter compound aromatizes.

Reactions

Oxidation and oxidative coupling
Alkaline solutions of gallic acid are readily oxidized by air. The oxidation is catalyzed by the enzyme gallate dioxygenase, an enzyme found in Pseudomonas putida.

Oxidative coupling of gallic acid with arsenic acid, permanganate, persulfate, or iodine yields ellagic acid, as does reaction of methyl gallate with iron(III) chloride. Gallic acid forms intermolecular esters (depsides) such as digallic and cyclic ether-esters (depsidones).

Hydrogenation
Hydrogenation of gallic acid gives the cyclohexane derivative hexahydrogallic acid.

Decarboxylation
Heating gallic acid gives pyrogallol (1,2,3-trihydroxybenzene). This conversion is catalyzed by gallate decarboxylase.

Esterification
Many esters of gallic acid are known, both synthetic and natural. Gallate 1-beta-glucosyltransferase catalyzes the glycosylation (attachment of glucose) of gallic acid.

Historical context and uses 
Gallic acid is an important component of iron gall ink, the standard European writing and drawing ink from the 12th to 19th centuries, with a history extending to the Roman empire and the Dead Sea Scrolls. Pliny the Elder (23-79 AD) describes the use of gallic acid as a means of detecting an adulteration of verdigris and writes that it was used to produce dyes. Galls (also known as oak apples) from oak trees were crushed and mixed with water, producing tannic acid. It could then be mixed with green vitriol (ferrous sulfate) — obtained by allowing sulfate-saturated water from a spring or mine drainage to evaporate — and gum arabic from acacia trees; this combination of ingredients produced the ink.

Gallic acid was one of the substances used by Angelo Mai (1782–1854), among other early investigators of palimpsests, to clear the top layer of text off and reveal hidden manuscripts underneath. Mai was the first to employ it, but did so "with a heavy hand", often rendering manuscripts too damaged for subsequent study by other researchers.

Gallic acid was first studied by the Swedish chemist Carl Wilhelm Scheele in 1786. In 1818, French chemist and pharmacist Henri Braconnot (1780–1855) devised a simpler method of purifying gallic acid from galls; gallic acid was also studied by the French chemist Théophile-Jules Pelouze (1807–1867), among others.

When mixed with acetic acid, gallic acid had uses in early types of photography, like the calotype to make the silver more sensitive to light; it was also used in developing photographs.

Occurrence 
Gallic acid is found in a number of land plants, such as the parasitic plant Cynomorium coccineum, the aquatic plant Myriophyllum spicatum, and the blue-green alga Microcystis aeruginosa. Gallic acid is also found in various oak species, Caesalpinia mimosoides, and in the stem bark of Boswellia dalzielii, among others. Many foodstuffs contain various amounts of gallic acid, especially fruits (including strawberries, grapes, bananas), as well as teas, cloves, and vinegars. Carob fruit is a rich source of gallic acid (24–165 mg per 100 g).

Esters 
Also known as galloylated esters:
 Methyl gallate
 Ethyl gallate, a food additive with E number E313
 Propyl gallate, or propyl 3,4,5-trihydroxybenzoate, an ester formed by the condensation of gallic acid and propanol
 Octyl gallate, the ester of octanol and gallic acid
 Dodecyl gallate, or lauryl gallate, the ester of dodecanol and gallic acid
 Epicatechin gallate, a flavan-3-ol, a type of flavonoid, present in green tea
 Epigallocatechin gallate (EGCG), also known as epigallocatechin 3-gallate, the ester of epigallocatechin and gallic acid, and a type of catechin
 Gallocatechin gallate (GCG), the ester of gallocatechin and gallic acid and a type of flavan-3ol
 Theaflavin-3-gallate, a theaflavin derivative

Gallate esters are antioxidants useful in food preservation, with propyl gallate being the most commonly used. Their use in human health is scantly supported by evidence.

See also 
 Benzoic acid
 Catechol
 Hydrolyzable tannin
 Pyrogallol
 Syringol
 Syringaldehyde
 Syringic acid
 Shikimic acid

References

Appendix

Spectral data 

Antioxidants
Astringent flavors
Chelating agents
Gallotannins
Pyrogallols
Reducing agents
Trihydroxybenzoic acids
Vinylogous carboxylic acids